Ajak may refer to:
Ajak, a fictional character in Marvel Comics
KRI Ajak, an Indonesian naval vessel
Ajak (Hungary), a town in Hungary